Fire Eagle was a Yahoo! owned service that stores a user's location and shares it with other authorized services. It was created at Yahoo! Brickhouse by a team which included among others Evan Henshaw-Plath, Tom Coates, Simon Willison, Jeannie H. Yang, Mor Naaman, Seth Fitzsimmons, Simon King, and Chris Martin.

A user could authorize other services and applications to update or access this information via the Fire Eagle API, allowing a user to update their location once and then use it on any Fire Eagle enabled-website. The intention of Fire Eagle was to serve as a central broker for location data. Services which supported Fire Eagle included Pownce, Dopplr, Brightkite and Movable Type.

The Fire Eagle service was one of the first sites to use the OAuth protocol to connect services together.

Fire Eagle has closed as of February 2013.

See also 
 Location awareness
 Radiodetermination

References

External links 
 Official website

Geosocial networking
Discontinued Yahoo! services
Location-based software